London Cottage is a historic home located near Pittsboro, Chatham County, North Carolina.  It was built about 1861. It is a -story, three bay Late Gothic Revival style frame dwelling. The house has a projecting cross-gable wing and a one-story rear ell.  It sits on a brick basement, is sheathed with board and batten siding, and has an overhanging gable roof with decorative brackets.

It was listed on the National Register of Historic Places in 1982.

References

Houses on the National Register of Historic Places in North Carolina
Gothic Revival architecture in North Carolina
Houses completed in 1861
Houses in Chatham County, North Carolina
National Register of Historic Places in Chatham County, North Carolina
Pittsboro, North Carolina
1861 establishments in North Carolina